Manuel Caupolicán Pichulman Plaza (born 14 September 1952), is a Chilean former professional footballer. He played forward for clubs in Chile, Belgium, and Central America.

Career
In Chile Pichulman played for Colo-Colo, Magallanes, Audax Italiano, Everton, Santiago Morning, and Iberia; he is most known for his stint at Magallanes. He was a member of Audax Italiano in 1976, when they were promoted to the Chilean Primera División. He made 18 appearances and scored 9 goals in the 1977 season.

In 1978, he emigrated to Europe and joined Royal Crossing Schaerbeek in the Belgian second level . He also played in Central America.

After football
Pichulman started an eponymous football academy (Escuela de Fútbol Manuel Pichulman) near , San Antonio.

Personal life
Pichulman is of Mapuche descent, his "Pichulman" means "condor feather" in Mapudungun.

References

1952 births
Living people
Chilean people of Mapuche descent
Chilean footballers
Chilean expatriate footballers
Colo-Colo footballers
Deportes Magallanes footballers
Magallanes footballers
Everton de Viña del Mar footballers
Audax Italiano footballers
K.V.V. Crossing Elewijt players
Santiago Morning footballers
Deportes Iberia footballers
Chilean Primera División players
Primera B de Chile players
Chilean expatriate sportspeople in Belgium
Expatriate footballers in Belgium
Association football forwards
Mapuche sportspeople
Indigenous sportspeople of the Americas
Place of birth missing (living people)